Scott William Flemming, (born 1958) is an American college professional basketball coach, who is currently the head coach and Technical Director of the NBA Academy in India. Prior to this he served as the Senior Director of Basketball Operations, NBA India. Before this he was the head coach of Northwest Nazarene University. He has also served as the head coach at Nyack College and Mount Vernon Nazarene University. His over-all college record as a head coach is 448-291.

Flemming made sports headlines internationally especially through his work as head coach of India’s national basketball team, which he coached from 2012 to 2015.

He also served as the top assistant coach (2010-2012) for the Texas Legends, the NBA Development League team of the Dallas Mavericks.

Flemming further directed numerous basketball camps and coached internationally in Sweden, Poland, Africa, Mexico and Jamaica.

Coaching highlights and achievements

India national team
Gold at the South Asian Championship (2014, 2015)
Gold Medal in the 2014 Lusofonia Games
Indian team beat China (in China) at the 2014 FIBA Asia Cup for the first time in history

US college
Two Time National Coach of the Year (1998, 2000)
Teams won 3 Conference tournaments and 2 regular season championships
Teams were in the Top 20 National Rankings 10 different seasons, unanimous No. 1 in 1999
Won the NCCAA National Championship over NCAA Div. I Gardner Webb

References

External links
Youtube Video – Coach Flemming talks about his coaching experience of India’s national team
Profile at eurobasket.com
Official website

1958 births
Living people
Basketball coaches from Massachusetts
Sportspeople from Boston
American expatriate basketball people in India